Diacetoxyscirpenol (DAS), also called anguidine, is a mycotoxin from the group of type A trichothecenes. It is a secondary metabolite product of fungi of the genus Fusarium and may cause toxicosis in farm animals.
The US Health and Human Services agency considers it a select agent for research purposes.

References 

Trichothecenes